Black Star Co-op is a community-owned brewpub co-op in Austin, Texas.  It is the first brewpub to operate under the Cooperative Principles.  It opened its doors in 2010 and as of 2021 has over 3,000 members.  It supports an on-site brewery as well as a restaurant and beer bar in Austin.

History
The co-op first met in January 2006 with sixteen people in attendance. By 2010, the growing organization raised more than $325,000 and found a location to begin operations. Black Star brews two groups of beers, the "rational" and "irrational". Rational beers are types beer drinkers may be familiar with and made with mostly traditional ingredients. Irrational beers are experimental and innovative with flavors not everyone may find palatable.

References 

Consumers' cooperatives in the United States
Beer brewing companies based in Texas